Bellarive was a Christian pop rock band that originated in Orlando, Florida in 2009. The band is composed of Sean Curran (vocals, keys and guitar), Melissa Mage (vocals and percussion), Mike Mage (programming, guitar and vocals), Zach Glotffelty (lead guitar), Josh Luker (bass guitar and percussion) and Kenny Werner (drums). After one self-released EP, they signed to Sparrow Records in May 2012, and released their debut studio album The Heartbeat on June 19, 2012. This album peaked on the Billboard Christian Albums chart at No. 21 and on the Heatseekers Albums chart at No. 17. Their second studio album, Before There Was, was released on July 22, 2014. They disbanded December 23, 2017.

Discography

Studio albums
 The Heartbeat (2012)
 Before There Was (2014)

EPs
 The Being Human Project...Start Listening (2009)

Singles
 "Love Has Found Us" (2010)
 "Sing" (2011)
 "Taste of Eternity" (2012)
 "Bring Us Back" (2014)

References

External links
 
 Official Youtube Channel

Musical groups established in 2009
Christian rock groups from Florida
Sparrow Records artists